Gene L. Hoffman (September 26, 1932 – December 28, 2007) was an American educator and politician.

Born on a farm near Canton, Illinois, Hoffman served in the United States Army. He received his bachelor's degree from Illinois State University and his master's and doctorate degrees from Northern Illinois University. He lived in Elmhurst, Illinois and taught social studies at Fenton High School in Bensenville, Illinois. From 1967 to 1991, Hoffman served in the Illinois House of Representatives and was a Republican. Hoffman died from Alzheimer's disease at Garden Terrace in Aurora, Colorado.

Notes

1932 births
2007 deaths
People from Canton, Illinois
People from Elmhurst, Illinois
Illinois State University alumni
Northern Illinois University alumni
Educators from Illinois
Republican Party members of the Illinois House of Representatives
20th-century American politicians